Classifier chains is a machine learning method for problem transformation in multi-label classification. It combines the computational efficiency of the Binary Relevance method while still being able to take the label dependencies  into account for classification.

Problem transformation 
Several problem transformation methods exist. One of them is the Binary Relevance method (BR). BR transforms the data set into  data sets and learns   binary classifiers  for each label . During this process the information about dependencies between labels is not preserved. This can lead to a situation where a set of labels is assigned to an instance although these labels never co-occur together in the data set. Thus, information about label co-occurrence can help to assign correct label combinations. Loss of this information can in some cases lead to a decrease in classification performance.

Another approach, which takes into account label correlations, is the Label Powerset method (LP). Each combination of labels in a data set is considered to be a single label. The main drawback of this approach is that the number of label combinations grows exponentionally with the number of labels. For example, a multi-label data set with 10 labels can have up to  label combinations. This increases the run-time of classification.

The Classifier Chains method is based on the BR method and it is efficient even on a big number of labels. Furthermore, it considers dependencies between labels.

Method description 
For a given a set of labels  the Classifier Chain model (CC) learns  classifiers as in  the Binary Relevance method. All classifiers are linked in a chain through feature space.

Given a data set where the -th instance has the form  where  is a subset of labels,  is a set of features. The data set is transformed in  data sets where instances of the -th data set has the form  . Thus, classifiers build a chain where each of them learns binary classification of a single label. The features given to each classifier are extended with binary values that indicate which of previous labels were assigned to the instance.

By classifying new instances the labels are again predicted by building a chain of classifiers. The classification begins with the first classifier  and proceeds to the last one  by passing label information between classifiers through the feature space. Hence, the inter-label dependency is preserved. However, the result can vary for different order of chains. For example, if a label often co-occur with some other label, then only instances of the label which comes later in the chain will have information about the other one in its feature vector. In order to solve this problem and increase accuracy it is possible to use ensemble of classifiers.

In Ensemble of Classifier Chains (ECC) several CC classifiers can be trained with random order of chains (i.e. random order of labels) on a random subset of data set. Labels of a new instance are predicted by each classifier separately. After that, the total number of predictions or "votes" is counted for each label. The label is accepted if it was predicted by a percentage of classifiers that is bigger than some threshold value.

References

External links 
Better Classifier Chains for Multi-label Classification Presentation on Classifier Chains by Jesse Read and Fernando Pérez Cruz

Classification algorithms